List of Guggenheim Fellowships awarded in 1963

United States and Canada

Latin American and Caribbean
 Alfredo Da Silva Creative Arts, Fine Arts

See also
Guggenheim Fellowship

References

1963
1963 awards